Francisco Javier Peral Periane (born 4 November 1983), known as Javito, is a Spanish retired professional footballer.

Club career

Barcelona
Born in Moraleja, Province of Cáceres, Extremadura, Javito joined FC Barcelona's youth system at the age of 17, signing from his local club. He made his professional debuts with their reserves, playing two seasons in Segunda División B and scoring a career-best ten goals in 29 games in his first.

Javito made his official debut for the first team on 7 December 2004, in a UEFA Champions League group stage match against FC Shakhtar Donetsk, playing the first half of the 0–2 away loss. However, he was unable to become a regular member of the main squad partly due to a long period on the sidelines as a result of thrombosis.

Aris
Javito joined Aris Thessaloniki F.C. in the summer of 2006, being the first of several Spaniards that would move to the Greek club in the following years as a result of the solid relationships between agent Manel Ferrer – an Aris collaborator – and the Spanish transfer market. He immediately established himself in the side's starting XI, helping them to the fourth position in the Superleague just one year after promoting.

In the 2007–08 playoffs, Javito netted twice in a 4–0 home win against AEK Athens FC. Previously, on 4 October 2007, he scored in a 1–2 loss at Real Zaragoza as his team won 2–2 on aggregate and qualified to the group stages in the UEFA Cup.

After his solid late performances for Aris, as his contract was due to expire, Javi signed for a further three years, earning an approximate annual wage of €180.000. He started the 2008–09 campaign in great individual form, and scored the winning goal against Olympiacos F.C. on 26 October 2008 (1–0), breaking the ten-year record of invincibility that their opponents held at the Kleanthis Vikelidis Stadium.

On 16 September 2010, Javito scored the game's only goal at home against Europa League title holders Atlético Madrid, and also played the full 90 minutes in the second game at the Vicente Calderón Stadium (3–2 win) with the Greek eventually finishing second in the group stage at the expense of precisely the opposition.

Deportivo / Olympiakos
On 31 January 2011, Javito returned to his country and joined La Liga club Deportivo de La Coruña. He would not make one single appearance during his four-month spell due to bureaucratic problems, which included the lack of his signature in the document sent to FIFA, with the Galicians eventually being relegated.

Javito returned to Greece in ensuing off-season as he signed with Olympiacos, which again featured several compatriots as manager Ernesto Valverde. In September 2012, his contract was terminated.

Back to Spain
In late December 2012, Javito signed with Segunda División side Hércules CF. He contributed with nine starts until the end of the season (748 minutes of action), moving to fellow league club AD Alcorcón subsequently.

Return to Greece
In summer 2014, Javito returned to Greece and its top level, agreeing to a one-year deal with PAE Kerkyra. The following year, he signed a one-year contract with fellow league club Panthrakikos FC.

International career
Javito earned his only cap for the Spain under-21 team on 7 June 2005, coming on as a late substitute for Jaime Gavilán in a 4–2 win against Bosnia and Herzegovina for the 2006 UEFA European Championship qualifiers.

Club statistics

References

External links

Deportivo archives

1983 births
Living people
Sportspeople from the Province of Cáceres
Spanish footballers
Footballers from Extremadura
Association football wingers
Segunda División players
Segunda División B players
Tercera División players
FC Barcelona C players
FC Barcelona Atlètic players
FC Barcelona players
Deportivo de La Coruña players
Hércules CF players
AD Alcorcón footballers
CD Guijuelo footballers
Super League Greece players
Aris Thessaloniki F.C. players
Olympiacos F.C. players
PAE Kerkyra players
Panthrakikos F.C. players
Süper Lig players
Orduspor footballers
Spain under-21 international footballers
Spanish expatriate footballers
Expatriate footballers in Greece
Expatriate footballers in Turkey
Spanish expatriate sportspeople in Greece
Spanish expatriate sportspeople in Turkey